John Michael Rogers, FBA, FSA (known as Michael; 1935 – 25 December 2022) was a British art historian who was an expert in Islamic art history. He was Khalili Professor Emeritus of Islamic Art at SOAS (University of London) from 1991 and a published author, recognised as foremost in his specialisation. In his later years, he was Honorary Curator of the World’s largest collection of Islamic art and antiquities in private hands.

Biography
Rogers studied Politics, Philosophy and Economics (PPE) at Corpus Christi College, Oxford (1958). National Service followed - initially in the Royal Artillery and latterly the Intelligence Corps, where he was commissioned and trained as a Russianist. After National Service he continued to briefly serve in the Territorial Army (Reserves), but returned to Academia and a research fellowship in philosophy at Oriel College; he latterly taught philosophy at Pembroke College and Wadham College. As his interests shifted from philosophy to Islamic art, he learned Turkish, and earned a PhD on the architectural patronage of Seljuq Anatolia under Samuel Stern and Victor Ménage.
Rogers taught Islamic art at the American University in Cairo, 1965–1977. In 1977 he  joined the British Museum, as a curator in the Department of Oriental Antiquities, where he organized several exhibitions including "Islamic Art and Design" (1983), and "Suleyman the Magnificent" (1988). He was also responsible for the installation of the Islamic collections in the John Addis Gallery in 1989.

From 1991 to 2000, Rogers was the Nasser D. Khalili Professor of Islamic Art and Archaeology at SOAS, University of London. From 1992, he was Honorary Curator of the Nasser D. Khalili Collection of Islamic Art. He was a Member of Council at the British Academy, 1992–1995.

Honours
 1972 Elected as a Fellow of the Society of Antiquaries.
 1988 Elected as a Fellow of the British Academy.

Selected publications
For a fuller bibliography, 1965–2004, see Essays in Honor of J.M. Rogers, ed. by Gülru Necipoğlu, Doris Behrens-Abouseif and Anna Contadinia (Brill, 2004)
 The Spread of Islam 
 Islamic Art and Design 1500-1700 (1983)
 Suleyman the Magnificent (1988)
 Sinan (Makers of Islamic Civilisation Series, I.B. Taruis) 
 Mughal Miniatures (1993)
 
 Mughal Miniatures (2006)
 

A special publication was prepared in his honour in 2004: Essays in Honor of J.M. Rogers, ed. by Gülru Necipoğlu, Doris Behrens-Abouseif and Anna Contadinia (Brill, 2004)

References

External links
Rogers on the British Academy website
Rogers on the SOAS website
Rogers on the British Museum website

1935 births
Living people
Employees of the British Museum
Fellows of the British Academy
Fellows of the Society of Antiquaries of London
Alumni of Corpus Christi College, Oxford